Yana Urqu (Quechua yana black, urqu mountain, "black mountain", Hispanicized spelling Yanaorjo) is a  mountain in the eastern extensions of the Willkapampa mountain range in the Andes of Peru. It is located in the Cusco Region, Urubamba Province, Ollantaytambo District, southwest of Ollantaytambo.

References

Mountains of Peru
Mountains of Cusco Region